Mexcala is a genus of jumping spiders that was first described by George and Elizabeth Peckham in 1902. The name is probably derived from the Nahuatl mezcal.

Species
 it contains twenty-one species, found only in Africa, Yemen, and Iran:
Mexcala agilis Lawrence, 1928 – Congo, Kenya, Malawi, Tanzania, Namibia
Mexcala angolensis Wesolowska, 2009 – Angola
Mexcala caerulea (Simon, 1901) – West Africa
Mexcala elegans Peckham & Peckham, 1903 – Ivory Coast, Malawi, Namibia, Botswana, Zimbabwe, South Africa
Mexcala farsensis Logunov, 2001 – Iran
Mexcala fizi Wesolowska, 2009 – Congo, Tanzania
Mexcala formosa Wesolowska & Tomasiewicz, 2008 – Ethiopia
Mexcala kabondo Wesolowska, 2009 – Congo, Malawi, Tanzania
Mexcala macilenta Wesolowska & Russell-Smith, 2000 – Ethiopia, Tanzania
Mexcala meridiana Wesolowska, 2009 – South Africa
Mexcala monstrata Wesolowska & van Harten, 1994 – Egypt, Yemen
Mexcala namibica Wesolowska, 2009 – Namibia
Mexcala nigrocyanea (Simon, 1886) – Libya, Egypt, Ethiopia
Mexcala ovambo Wesolowska, 2009 – Namibia
Mexcala quadrimaculata (Lawrence, 1942) – Zimbabwe, South Africa
Mexcala rufa Peckham & Peckham, 1902 (type) – Namibia, South Africa
Mexcala signata Wesolowska, 2009 – Kenya, Tanzania
Mexcala smaragdina Wesolowska & Edwards, 2012 – Nigeria
Mexcala synagelese Wesolowska, 2009 – Sudan, Ivory Coast, Nigeria, Congo, Angola
Mexcala torquata Wesolowska, 2009 – Ivory Coast, Guinea
Mexcala vicina Wesolowska, 2009 – Cameroon, Congo

References

Salticidae
Salticidae genera
Spiders of Africa
Spiders of Asia